Cape Deacon is an ice-covered cape forming the southeast tip of Kemp Peninsula on the east coast of Palmer Land. It was probably first seen by members of the United States Antarctic Service who photographed a portion of Kemp Peninsula while exploring this coast from the air in December 1940. During 1947 the cape was photographed from the air by members of the Ronne Antarctic Research Expedition, who in conjunction with the Falkland Islands Dependencies Survey, charted it from the ground. It was named by the UK Antarctic Place-Names Committee after George E.R. Deacon (1906–84), an English oceanographer and member of the Discovery Investigations staff, 1927–39, and Director of the National Institute of Oceanography, 1949–71.

References
 

Headlands of Palmer Land